The 1965 Nippon Professional Baseball season was the 16th season of operation of Nippon Professional Baseball (NPB).

Regular season

Standings

League leaders

Central League

Pacific League

Awards
Most Valuable Player
Sadaharu Oh, Yomiuri Giants (CL)
Katsuya Nomura, Nankai Hawks (PL)
Rookie of the Year
No CL recipient
Masaaki Ikenaga, Nishitetsu Lions (PL)
Eiji Sawamura Award
Minoru Murayama, Hanshin Tigers (CL)

See also
1965 Major League Baseball season

References